Charles "Charlie" Gustav Thorson (29 August 1890 – 7 August 1966) was a Canadian political cartoonist, character designer, children's book author and illustrator. Thorson is best known as the man who designed an early version of the then yet unnamed Bugs Bunny.

Early life and family
Thorson was born in Gimli, Manitoba, Canada and given the name Karl Gústaf Stefánsson. He was of Icelandic descent, as his parents were part of the Icelandic immigration to Canada in the 19th century. His parents were part of the 1,700 Icelanders who registered with the Winnipeg Immigration Office in 1887. Politician Joseph Thorson was his older brother.

Career
Thorson's self-portrait drawing in 1931 portrayed him as a Viking based on his Icelandic descent.

From 1935 to 1945, Thorson worked in American animation studios, including The Walt Disney Company and Warner Bros. He contributed sketches of hundreds of cartoon characters, including Snow White, Elmer Fudd, Little Hiawatha, Sniffles the Mouse, Bugs Bunny and Inki. 

Thorson wrote two children's books, Keeko in 1947 and Chee-chee and Keeko in 1952, about the adventures of a little Native American boy. He also created the character Punkinhead, which appeared in several children's books and in Eaton's catalogues for many years.

Thorson lived his life without public credit for his creations. His name was never mentioned in associated movie credits, and "rarely mentioned in studio records or in other animation books." These creations can be found in Thorson's personal albums that includes sketches and model drawings shared with his family.

Thorson died in Vancouver, British Columbia in 1966.

References

Notes

Bibliography
Cartoon Charlie: The Life and Art of Animation Pioneer Charles Thorson, by Prof. Gene Walz (with the assistance of Stephen Thorson. Winnipeg, Manitoba, Canada: Great Plains Publications, 1998. 222 pages. .
 Charlie Thorson fonds, University of Manitoba

External links

 "Charles Gustav Thorson" – The Canadian Encyclopedia

1890 births
1966 deaths
Canadian people of Icelandic descent
Artists from Winnipeg
Canadian cartoonists
Walt Disney Animation Studios people